Larissa Margot Bieler (born 27 October 1978) is a Swiss journalist. She is the director and editor-in-chief of Swissinfo.

Biography 
Bieler studied German, economics and politics at the University of Zurich. Before and after studying in Paris and Mannheim, she worked for many years as a freelance journalist for the Bündner Tagblatt and various Bündner Medien. By July 2013, she was editor-in-chief of the Bündner Tagblatt. Bieler has been editor-in-chief of SWI swissinfo.ch since January 2016. In addition, she was appointed director of SWI swissinfo.ch in autumn 2018.

Bieler has been President of the Quality in Journalism Association since 2017 and a member of the Board of Directors of SWISS TXT.

References

1978 births
Living people
People from Chur
21st-century Swiss journalists
Swiss women journalists